2019 Emmy Awards may refer to:

 71st Primetime Emmy Awards, the 2019 Emmy Awards ceremony honoring primetime programming during June 2018 – May 2019
 46th Daytime Emmy Awards, the 2019 Emmy Awards ceremony honoring daytime programming during 2018
 47th International Emmy Awards, the 2019 ceremony honoring international programming

Emmy Award ceremonies by year